Kwaku Agyapong Danemah popularly known as Dr. Paa Bobo (11 September 1951 - 28 December 2013) was a Ghanaian highlife musician, known as highlife music legend. He is also known for the popular and nationwide hit song Osobro kyee. In January 2020, Stonebwoy with his Bhim Band remixed Osobro kyee titled Sobolo.

The late Dr. Paa Bobo is noted to have travelled to Nigeria during which he recorded a couple of his songs.

References 

Ghanaian highlife musicians
1951 births
2013 deaths